The Darwin Adventure is a 1972 British drama film directed by Jack Couffer and written by William Fairchild. The film stars Nicholas Clay, Susan Macready, Ian Richardson, Christopher Martin, Robert Flemyng and Philip Brack. The film was released on 27 September 1972, by 20th Century Fox.

Premise
During his 5-year voyage around the world aboard , a young Charles Darwin adventured into the farthest corners of creation in his search for the truth.  A truth which at the time shocked and horrified the world.

Plot

Cast 
Nicholas Clay as Charles Darwin
Susan Macready as Emma Wedgewood Darwin
Ian Richardson as Capt. Fitzroy
Christopher Malcolm as Sullivan
Robert Flemyng as Prof. Henslow
Philip Brack as Thomas Huxley
Michael Malnick as Hooker
Aubrey Woods as Bishop Wilberforce
David Davenport as Robert Darwin
Hugh Morton as Josiah Wedgewood
Carl Bernard as Moreno
Richard Ireson as Wickam

References

External links 
 

1972 films
20th Century Fox films
British drama films
1972 drama films
Films directed by Jack Couffer
Films scored by Marc Wilkinson
1970s English-language films
1970s British films